Maa Vindhyavasini Autonomous State Medical College, also known as Government Medical College, Mirzapur, is a full-fledged tertiary government Medical college and hospital. It is located at Mirzapur in Uttar Pradesh, India. The college imparts the degree of Bachelor of Medicine and Surgery (MBBS). The yearly undergraduate student intake is 100.

Courses
This medical college undertakes the education and training of 100 students in MBBS courses.

Affiliated
The college is affiliated with Atal Bihari Vajpayee Medical University and is recognized by the National Medical Commission.

References

Medical colleges in Uttar Pradesh
Educational institutions established in 2021
2021 establishments in Uttar Pradesh